Gary Raymond Veneruzzo (born June 28, 1943) is a Canadian former professional ice hockey player who played seven games in the National Hockey League (NHL) and 348 games in the World Hockey Association (WHA). Veneruzzo played with the NHL's St. Louis Blues and the WHA's Los Angeles Sharks, Michigan Stags, Baltimore Blades, Cincinnati Stingers, Phoenix Roadrunners, and San Diego Mariners. Veneruzzo was born in Fort William, Ontario.

Playing career
Veneruzzo was a minor league player playing in the Toronto Maple Leafs system for the Tulsa Oilers in the Central Professional Hockey League when the NHL expanded in 1967. He was the selected in the 19th round of the 1967 NHL Expansion Draft by the St. Louis Blues. Veneruzzo initially did not make the NHL roster and was farmed out to their affiliate in the Central Professional League, the Kansas City Blues, where he led the team in scoring - and earned a brief call up to the NHL team. He scored a goal and an assist in five NHL regular appearances and appeared in nine Stanley Cup games, where he was credited with two assists. The following two years Veneruzzo was in the minors despite having decent statistics. He was called up in 1972 for two games with the Blues where he was held scoreless.

Veneruzzo jumped to the WHA for its inaugural season in 1972-73, signing with the Los Angeles Sharks. He led the Sharks in scoring that season with 43 goals and 30 assists, and the following year was second on the team, behind Marc Tardif with 39 goals and 29 assists. The Sharks moved to Michigan in 1974 and then midway through the season to Baltimore, and Veneruzzo again led the team in scoring with 33 goals and 27 assists. He started the following year with the Cincinnati Stingers before being traded to Phoenix. Veneruzzo played one more year in the WHA, closing his career with the San Diego Mariners in 1976-77.

Altogether Veneruzzo ranked 56th overall in all time scoring in the WHA, having played 348 games in the WHA scoring 151 goals, 123 assists and 274 points coupled with 212 penalty minutes in regular season games, and five goals, no assists and 11 penalty minutes in 18 playoff appearances.  

He was inducted into the Northwestern Ontario Sports Hall of Fame in 2000.

Major League Statistics

External links 

1943 births
Living people
Baltimore Blades players
Buffalo Bisons (AHL) players
Canadian ice hockey left wingers
Cincinnati Stingers players
Ice hockey people from Ontario
Seattle Totems (WHL) players
Sportspeople from Thunder Bay
Los Angeles Sharks players
Michigan Stags players
Phoenix Roadrunners (WHA) players
St. Louis Blues players
San Diego Mariners players
Victoria Maple Leafs players
Canadian expatriate ice hockey players in the United States